Turbonilla levis, common name the delicate turbonilla,  is a species of sea snail, a marine gastropod mollusk in the family Pyramidellidae, the pyrams and their allies.

Description
The shell grows to a length of 2.8 mm to 4.6 mm.

Distribution
This species occurs in the following locations:
 Aruba
 Bonaire
 Caribbean Sea : Colombia, Costa Rica, Curaçao, Jamaica
 Gulf of Mexico
 Atlantic Ocean: off North Carolina

References

 Menke, K. T. 1830. Synopsis methodica Molluscorum.  xvi + 169. Author: Pyrmont.
 Bartsch, P. 1955. The pyramidellid mollusks of the Pliocene deposits of North St. Petersburg, Florida. Smithsonian Miscellaneous Collections 125(2): iii + 102 pp., 18 pls.

External links
 To Biodiversity Heritage Library (2 publications)
 To Encyclopedia of Life
 To ITIS
 To World Register of Marine Species
 

levis
Gastropods described in 1850